Neurodiversity refers to diversity in the human brain and cognition, for instance in sociability, learning, attention, mood, and other mental functions. It gives an inclusive view of cognitive diversity, highlighting the differences at a neuro-biological level while considering the socio-cultural contexts of a human's lived experience.

The term was coined in 1998 by sociologist Judy Singer, who helped popularize the concept along with journalist Harvey Blume, and situates human cognitive variation in the context of biodiversity and the politics of minority groups. This view arose out of the autism rights movement, as a challenge to prevailing views that certain things currently classified as neurodevelopmental disorders are inherently pathological. It builds on the social model of disability, in which disability arises out of societal barriers interacting with individual differences, rather than people being disabled simply as a result of having inherent deficits.

Some neurodiversity advocates and researchers, notably Judy Singer and Patrick Dwyer, argue that the neurodiversity paradigm is the middle ground between strong medical model and strong social model.

The subsequent neurodiversity paradigm has been controversial among disability advocates, with opponents arguing it risks downplaying the suffering associated with some disabilities, and calls for the acceptance of things some would wish to see treated.

Autistic self-advocate and researcher Ari Ne'eman, one of the major advocates in the neurodiversity movement, suggested a trait-based approach, meaning that elements of the medical (or pathology) model can be applied in treating certain traits, behaviors, or conditions that are intrinsically harmful (e.g. self-injury behaviors, speech-language impairments, or other co-occurring health conditions), whereas neurodiversity approaches can be applied to non-harmful or adaptive autistic traits (e.g. stimming, intense interests) of the same individual. Furthermore, in recent years, there have been developments of neurodiversity-affirming interventions and reforms of some interventions.

History 
The word neurodiversity is attributed to Judy Singer, a social scientist who has described herself as "likely somewhere on the autistic spectrum." She used the term in her sociology honours thesis published in 1999, drawing on discussions on the InLv mailing list with others including American journalist and writer Harvey Blume, whose September 30, 1998, article in The Atlantic was the first to use the term in print. The term represented a move away from previous "mother-blaming" theories about the cause of autism.

Some authors also credit the earlier work of autistic advocate Jim Sinclair in advancing the concept of neurodiversity. Sinclair was a principal early organizer of the international online autism community. Sinclair's 1993 speech, "Don't mourn for us", emphasized autism as a way of being: "It is not possible to separate the person from the autism." In a New York Times piece written by Blume on June 30, 1997, Blume described the foundation of neurodiversity using the term "neurological pluralism". Blume was an early advocate who predicted the role the Internet would play in fostering the international neurodiversity movement.

In recent years the concept of neurodiversity is increasingly being taken on board by scientists, recognising that autism researchers have sometimes been too ready to interpret differences as deficits, that there are ethical risks and may be practical risks in reducing or suppressing autistic traits in interventions. Some researchers are concerned about uncertain and possible risks that some interventions may promote excessive camouflaging (e.g. imitating neurotypical traits and behaviors, masking autistic traits), as higher levels of camouflaging are generally associated with poorer mental health outcomes among autistic people in numerous recent studies, and perhaps even suicidality. Also, some advocates and researchers argue that a medicalising approach can contribute to stigma and that the persistent focus on biological research in autism is at odds with the priorities of those in the autism community.

Neurotypical
Neurotypical (NT, an abbreviation of neurologically typical) is a neologism widely used in the neurodiversity movement as a label for non-neurodivergent people. That is, anyone who has a typical neurotype, so excluding autistic people, those with ADHD, dyslexia, and so on. The term has been adopted by both the neurodiversity movement and the scientific community. It is not to be confused with the term allistic, which refers specifically to non-autistic people, who may or may not have a divergent neurotype.

Term
Early definitions described neurotypicals as "people who do not have autistic-type brains", clarifying that this would exclude "autistic cousins" who are recognizably “autistic-like” but not necessarily autistic. Early uses of "NT" were often satirical, as in the Institute for the Study of the Neurologically Typical, but with time it came to be widely used unironically.

People with any form of neurocognitive or mental disorder, whether congenital or acquired, have also sometimes been excluded from the neurotypical label, particularly in academic studies for specific disorders that use neurotypical control groups. In this sense, the term is now contrasted to neurodivergent, an umbrella term inclusive of people with diverse mental and behavioral differences, such as mood, anxiety, dissociative, psychotic, personality, and eating disorders.

The conditions themselves, following the neurodiversity and social construction of disability models and in distance from the hegemonic medical model of disability (otherwise known in the neurodiversity community as the "pathology paradigm"), are often referred to as neurodivergencies—that is, neurotypes that are divergent from a given social and medical norm.

Some people prefer the term allistic, which unambiguously means "not autistic".

The National Autistic Society of the United Kingdom says of the term "neurotypical": "neurotypical is mainly used by autistic people so may not be applicable in, for example, the popular press."

Reception 
"Critiques of the Neurodiversity Movement", a 2020 review, argued two basic observations:
 Many people who do not have an autism diagnosis have autistic traits. This was known by researchers as the "broad autism phenotype". So, there was no clear bimodal distribution separating people with and without autism. In reality there were not two distinct populations, one "neurotypical" and one "neurodivergent".
 "Neurotypical" was a dubious construct, because there was nobody who could be considered truly neurotypical. There was no such standard for the human brain.

Double empathy 
Double empathy is a concept and theory that holds that autistic people do not lack empathy, but rather that the experiences of autistic people and neurotypicals are different enough to where it is hard for one to understand what the other thinks. For example, non-autistic people may not understand when an autistic person is overwhelmed, which is a social difficulty on the part of neurotypicals rather than autistic individuals.

It was originally conceived in 2012 by Damian Milton, an autistic scholar. Researchers such as Catherine Crompton expanded on this by conducting studies comparing the conversations and socialization of autistic groups, non-autistic groups, and mixed groups. For example, one study found that autistic people were more able to build rapport with other autistic people than with non-autistic people, and at a level similar to the purely non-autistic group.

Within disability rights movements 

The neurodiversity paradigm was developed and embraced first by autistic people. Subsequently, it was applied to other neurodevelopmental and/or neuropsychiatric conditions such as attention deficit hyperactivity disorder (ADHD), developmental speech disorders, dyslexia, dysgraphia, dyspraxia, dyscalculia, dysnomia, intellectual disability, and Tourette syndrome. Broader conceptualizations include mental illnesses such as schizophrenia, bipolar disorder, schizoaffective disorder, and, somewhat more controversially, personality disorders such as antisocial personality disorder. Neurodiversity advocates denounce the framing of neurodevelopmental disorders as requiring medical intervention to "cure" or "fix" them, and instead promote support systems such as inclusion-focused services, accommodations, communication and assistive technologies, occupational training, and independent living support. The intention is for individuals to receive support that honours authentic forms of human diversity, self-expression, and being, rather than treatment which coerces or forces them to adopt normative ideas of normality, or to conform to a clinical ideal.

Proponents of neurodiversity strive to reconceptualize autism and related conditions in society by the following measures: acknowledging that neurodiversity does not require a cure; changing the language from the current "condition, disease, disorder, or illness"-based nomenclature; "broadening the understanding of healthy or independent living"; acknowledging new types of autonomy; and giving neurodivergent individuals more control over their treatment, including the type, timing, and whether there should be treatment at all.

Activists such as Jennifer White-Johnson have helped bring attention to the neurodiversity movement, by creating symbols of protest and recognition. The Autistic spectrum, and the greater neurodiversity movement, is symbolized by White-Johnson by the black power fist and the infinity symbol.< Halstead, Josh (2021). Extra Bold. New York: Princeton Architectural Press. p. 39. ISBN 9781616899189.>

A 2009 study separated 27 students (with autism, dyslexia, developmental coordination disorder, ADHD, and stroke), into two categories of self-view: "A 'difference' view—where neurodiversity was seen as a difference incorporating a set of strengths and weaknesses, or a 'medical/deficit' view—where neurodiversity was seen as a disadvantageous medical condition." They found that, although all of the students reported uniformly difficult schooling careers involving exclusion, abuse, and bullying, those who viewed themselves from a different view (41% of the study cohort) "Indicated higher academic self-esteem and confidence in their abilities and many (73%) expressed considerable career ambitions with positive and clear goals." Many of these students reported gaining this view of themselves through contact with neurodiversity advocates in online support groups.

A 2013 online survey, which aimed to assess conceptions of autism and neurodiversity, found that "A deficit-as-difference conception of autism suggests the importance of harnessing autistic traits in developmentally beneficial ways, transcending a false dichotomy between celebrating differences and ameliorating deficit."

Neurodiversity and the workplace 
Neurodiverse individuals are subjected to bias when applying and interviewing for job positions. Specifically, neurodiverse individuals can have their social engagement style compared to neurotypical individuals, and it can affect their ability to obtain a job position. Neurodiversity stigmas, especially against autistic individuals, and cognition challenges in social situations can hinder an individual's ability to perform well in a traditional job interview.

Once in the workplace, neurodiverse employees continue to run into barriers. In a systematic review that considered developmental dyslexia (DD) as "an expression of neurodiversity," it was suggested that neurodiversity is not yet an established concept in the workplace, and therefore, support from social relationships and work accommodations is minimal. Furthermore, another systematic review that focused on intervention studies for supporting adults with attention deficit hyperactivity disorder (ADHD) discovered that there were few workplace-based intervention studies. The covered studies mainly assessed pharmacological and combined (pharmacological and psychosocial) interventions. Additional research needs to be conducted to figure out how to best support neurodiverse employees in the workplace.

When the COVID-19 pandemic occurred, remote work became more common, and researchers like Yael Goldfarb began looking into digital transitions and the implications for employees with autism. Goldfarb's study suggested that these individuals would benefit more from remote work as it allowed them to engage in their interests, but social engagement is still necessary for productivity and performance. Another study that assessed remote work employees with autism supported Goldfarb's findings and stressed the need for redesigned work and social conditions to be more inclusive for individuals with autism.

Controversy

The neurodiversity paradigm is controversial in autism advocacy. The dominant paradigm is one which pathologizes human brains that diverge from those considered typical. From this perspective, these brains have medical conditions which should be treated.

A common criticism is that the neurodiversity paradigm is too widely encompassing and that its conception should exclude those whose functioning is more severely impaired. Autistic advocate and interdisciplinary educator Nick Walker offers the distinction that neurodivergences refer specifically to "pervasive neurocognitive differences" that are "intimately related to the formation and constitution of the self," in contrast to medical conditions such as epilepsy.

Neurodiversity advocate John Elder Robison argues that the disabilities and strengths conferred by neurological differences may be mutually inseparable. "When 99 neurologically identical people fail to solve a problem, it's often the 1% fellow who's different who holds the key. Yet that person may be disabled or disadvantaged most or all of the time. To neurodiversity proponents, people are disabled because they are at the edges of the bell curve, not because they are sick or broken."

In the media 
The increase of representation of the neurodiversity movement in the media came about with changes in the technology of the media platforms themselves. The recent addition of text-based options on various social media sites allow disabled users to communicate, enjoy, and share at a more accessible rate. Social media has a two-fold benefit to the neurodiverse community. It can help spread awareness and pioneer the neurodiversity movement, and it can also allow members of the communities themselves to connect.

Social media as connecting platform 
Media platforms allow the connection of individuals of similar backgrounds to find a community of support with one another. Online networking and connections allows for the user to decide their level of comfort with interactions, and allow them to retain control of a relationship with another user. For the neurodiverse community, the use of social media to create relationships has proven a useful tool for those with difficulty in social situations. By connecting neurodiverse users, media platforms are to provide 'safe spaces' that is helpful in the making of relationships. Some media developers, such as Divyanka Kapoor, have taken a step further and created platforms such as "Blossom" which are designed specifically to connect neurodiverse users and families. Platforms such as Blossom remove the external pressure for neurotypical users and allow the neurodiverse community to seek security and familiarity within a platform built especially for them.

Social media as a driving force 
Another way in which media has the potential to benefit the neurodiverse community is by allowing users (especially popular influencers) to spread awareness about the neurodiversity movement. Increasing awareness about disorders, especially those often debated by non-experts such as neurodiversity, has shown to increase the amount of factual information spread. The spread of information through social media exposure can assist the neurodiversity movement in educating the public about understanding disabilities such as autism and sifting out misinformation. By sharing neurodiverse experiences from a first hand perspective, media influencers have power to educate the public as well as destigmatize certain disorders. As negative portrayals of neurodiversity have an obstructive impact on members the community, changing the narrative through social media exposure is a tool the ND community is employing.

Challenges within media 
Although representation of the neurodiverse community has grown with the help of social media platforms, those users are often criticized and misunderstood. Social media has not removed the social barriers that restrict inclusion of neurodiverse peoples. The persisting barriers in social media are deeper than the issues of accessibility. Neurodiverse users are reported to be limited to their platform to conform to the mainstream view of their disability to be seen as "authentic" users. The push for "authentic" users on the internet has grown with the use of social media itself. While the premise of sifting through ingenuine users was not a broach to the ND community, it has indirectly made it more difficult for neurodiverse users to grow platforms. This issue of non-disabled users evaluating the authenticity of a neurodivergent user based on stereotypes shows the battle that the neurodiversity movement has not reached its goal of inclusion.

See also

 Appeal to nature
 Autistic art
 Autistic Pride Day
 Anti-psychiatry
 Disability flag
 Disability rights movement
 Functional diversity
 Genetic diversity
 Identity Politics
 Mad pride movement
 Mental illness denial
 Multiplicity (psychology)
 NeuroTribes
 Political correctness
 Psychiatric survivors movement
 Societal and cultural aspects of autism
 Societal and cultural aspects of Tourette syndrome
 The Myth of Mental Illness

References

Further reading
 
 
 McNamara, Brittany (2016). "The Kaleidoscope Society Is Smashing ADHD Stigma for Women and Girls", December 12, 2016.
 Nerenberg, Jenara (2017). "What Neurodiversity Is And Why Companies Should Embrace It", Fast Company May 19, 2017.
 
 
 Praslova, Ludmila N.(2021). Autism Doesn’t Hold People Back at Work. Discrimination Does. Harvard Business Review, December 13, 2021.
 Praslova, Ludmila N.(2021). Neurodivergent people make great leaders, not just employees. Fast Company, December 15, 2021.
 Praslova, Ludmila N.(2022). An Intersectional Approach to Inclusion at Work. Harvard Business Review, June 21, 2022
 Singer, Judy (2016). NeuroDiversity: The Birth of an Idea. 
 Smith, Theo and Kirby, Amanda (2021). Neurodiversity at Work: Drive Innovation, Performance and Productivity with a Neurodiverse Workforce.

External links 
 
 
 

 
Mental health
Disability rights
Sociological terminology
1998 neologisms
1990s neologisms